() is a legal term that comes from the Latin phrase for "I do not wish to contend". It is also referred to as a plea of no contest or no defense.

In criminal trials in certain United States jurisdictions, it is a plea where the defendant neither admits nor disputes a charge, serving as an alternative to a pleading of guilty or not guilty. A no-contest plea, while not technically a guilty plea, typically has the same immediate effect as a guilty plea and is often offered as a part of a plea bargain.

United States
In the United States, state law determines whether, and under what circumstances, a defendant may plead no contest in state criminal cases. In federal court, the Federal Rules of Criminal Procedure only allow a  plea to be entered with the court's consent; before accepting the plea, the court is required to "consider the parties' views and the public interest in the effective administration of justice".

Residual effects
A  plea has the same immediate effects as a plea of guilty, but may have different residual effects or consequences in future actions. For instance, a conviction arising from a  plea is subject to any and all penalties, fines, and forfeitures of a conviction from a guilty plea in the same case, and can be considered as an aggravating factor in future criminal actions. However, unlike a guilty plea, a defendant in a  plea may not be required to allocute the charges. This means that a  conviction typically may not be used to establish either negligence per se, malice, or whether the acts were committed at all in later civil proceedings related to the same set of facts as the criminal prosecution.

Under the Federal Rules of Evidence, and in those states whose rules of evidence are similar or identical to them,  pleas may not be used to defeat the hearsay prohibition if offered as an "admission by [a] party-opponent". Assuming the appropriate gravity of the charge, and all other things being equal, a guilty plea to the same charge would cause the reverse effect: An opponent at trial could introduce the plea, over a hearsay objection, as evidence to establish a certain fact.

Alaska
In Alaska, a criminal conviction based on a  plea may be used against the defendant in future civil actions. The Alaska Supreme Court ruled in 2006 that a "conviction based on a no contest plea will collaterally estop the criminal defendant from denying any element in a subsequent civil action against him that was necessarily established by the conviction, as long as the prior conviction was for a serious criminal offense and the defendant in fact had the opportunity for a full and fair hearing".

California
In California, a  plea is known as a West plea after a seminal case involving plea bargains, People v. West (1970) 3 Cal.3d 595.

A nolo contendere plea to any felony is considered exactly equivalent to a guilty plea for the purposes of civil actions; this plea to any non-felony is not admissible to a civil action.

Florida
In Florida, the Supreme Court held in 2005 that no-contest convictions may be treated as prior convictions for the purposes of future sentencing.

Michigan
In Michigan, "A nolo contendere plea does not admit guilt, it merely communicates to the court that the criminal defendant does not wish to contest the state's accusations and will acquiesce in the imposition of punishment." A nolo contendere plea may be appropriate "where the defendant would not be able to supply a sufficient factual basis for a guilty plea because he or she was intoxicated on the night of the incident, where there is the possibility of future civil litigation resulting from the offense, or where a defendant cannot remember the events which led to his or her being charged with a crime".

A no contest plea prevents the court from eliciting a defendant's admission of guilt, but the result of the defendant's plea not to contest the charges against him or her is the same as if the defendant had admitted guilt. If a defendant pleads no contest to a charged offense, with the exception of questioning the defendant about his or her role in the charged offense, the court must proceed in the same manner as if the defendant had pleaded guilty. A plea of no contest to a felony offense requires the court's consent.

A defendant's no contest plea to criminal charges does not estop that defendant from denying responsibility in a later civil action arising from the same conduct.

Texas
In Texas, the right to appeal the results of a plea bargain taken from a plea of either  or "guilty" is highly restricted. Defendants who have entered a plea of  may only appeal the judgment of the court if the appeal is based on written pretrial motions ruled upon by the court.

Virginia
The Virginia Rules of Evidence differ from the parallel federal rules in that a  plea entered in a criminal case is admissible in a related civil proceeding.

Commonwealth
The defendant must enter a plea of "guilty" or "not guilty". If a defendant refuses to enter a plea, the court will record a plea of "not guilty".

See also

 Nolle prosequi
 Alford plea

References

Pleas
Latin legal terminology